Charles Edmund Andrus Jr., best known as Chuck Andrus (November 17, 1928 – June 12, 1997) was an American jazz double-bassist.

Andrus was born in Holyoke, Massachusetts, raised in New England, and studied at the Manhattan School of Music. In the late 1940s he formed his own ensemble in Springfield, Massachusetts which included Sal Salvador and Phil Woods. He played with Charlie Barnet in 1953, then with Claude Thornhill through the middle of the decade. While with Thornhill he met Terry Gibbs, and the two frequently played and recorded together in subsequent years. As a freelance musician in New York, Andrus worked with Don Stratton, Bernard Peiffer, and Jim Chapin; he also recorded extensively with Woody Herman.

Discography
With Woody Herman
 Swing Low, Sweet Clarinet (Philips, 1962)
 Woody Herman–1963 (Philips, 1963)
 1963: The Swingin'est Big Band Ever (Philips, 1963)
 Encore (Philips, 1963)
 My Kind of Broadway (Columbia, 1964)
 The Swinging Herman Herd-Recorded Live (Philips, 1964)
 Woody Herman: 1964 (Philips, 1964)
 Woody's Big Band Goodies (Philips, 1965)
 1963 Live Guard Sessions (Jazz Band 1991)
 Live in Stereo 1963 Summer Tour (Jazz Hour 1991)

With others
 Jim Chapin, The Jim Chapin Sextet (Classic Jazz 1977)
 Bernard Peiffer, Bernie's Tunes (EmArcy, 1956)
(Herbie Mann)  Early Mann (1954)

References

1928 births
1997 deaths
American jazz double-bassists
Male double-bassists
20th-century American musicians
20th-century double-bassists
20th-century American male musicians
American male jazz musicians
People from Holyoke, Massachusetts